Sparadici is a small settlement located between Šibenik and Primosten, Croatia. It is a part of a bigger village called Grebaštica. The main economic activity is tourism.

References

Populated places in Šibenik-Knin County